Tubulin alpha-8 chain is a protein that in humans is encoded by the TUBA8 gene.

References

Further reading